The Georgia Marble Company and Tate Historic District was listed on the National Register of Historic Places in 2005. The district is centered on Georgia State Route 53 between Georgia State Route 5 and Long Swamp Creek, in or near Tate, Georgia. The main office of the Georgia Marble Company was built in 1884 in Mission Revival style.

It includes the Tate House, which has four  columns, and has marble balustrades and fountains designed by Georgia Marble Company designer J. B. Hill.  The Tate House was separately listed on the National Register in 1974. The district also includes Late Gothic Revival architecture and Colonial Revival.

It also includes the Tate Gymnasium, which was separately listed on the National Register in 2002.

Also included:
Tate Depot (built after 1900), on the Louisville and Nashville Railroad line
Tate Methodist Church (1887), on Georgia Highway 53, a Gothic Revival-style church
Methodist Episcopal Church South (c.1887), in Smoky Hollow, built to serve African American employees. Later the Miracle Pentecostal Fellowship Church.  Later shared by the Marble Valley Friends and the Mt. Calvary Baptist Church.

The district's  include 106 contributing buildings, 15 contributing structures, and seven other contributing sites.

References

Historic districts on the National Register of Historic Places in Georgia (U.S. state)
National Register of Historic Places in Pickens County, Georgia
Buildings and structures completed in 1840
Late Gothic Revival architecture
Colonial Revival architecture in Georgia (U.S. state)